Holy Ghost Ukrainian Catholic Church is a Ukrainian Greek Catholic church in West Easton, Pennsylvania. Father Paul Makar is the administrator. Father Yaroslav Lukavenko is the church's parochial vicar.

References

External links
Official website]

Churches in Pennsylvania
Roman Catholic churches in Pennsylvania
Ukrainian-American culture in Pennsylvania